Jairo Duzant (born 1 August 1979 in Willemstad) is a track and field sprinter from Curaçao. His personal best times are 10.37 seconds over 100 metres and 20.78 seconds over 200 metres.

Achievements

References

External links
 

1979 births
Living people
People from Willemstad
Dutch Antillean male sprinters
Curaçao male sprinters
Athletes (track and field) at the 2003 Pan American Games
Pan American Games competitors for the Netherlands Antilles
Central American and Caribbean Games gold medalists for the Netherlands Antilles
Competitors at the 2006 Central American and Caribbean Games
Central American and Caribbean Games medalists in athletics